Kareena is a female given name. Notable persons with that name include:

Notable people 
 Kareena Cuthbert (born 1987), Scottish field hockey player
 Kareena Kapoor (born 1980), Indian film actress
 Kareena Lee (born 1993), Australian swimmer

Fictional characters 
 Kareena Ferreira, character from soap opera EastEnders 
 Kareena Jones, character from sketch comedy television series All That

See also
 Kareena Kareena, Zee TV comedy serial
 Karina (disambiguation)

Arabic feminine given names
Indian feminine given names